The smallfin catshark (Apristurus parvipinnis) is a catshark of the family Scyliorhinidae in the order Carcharhiniformes, found in the western Atlantic at depths between 635 and 1,115 m. Its length is up to 48 cm.

References

 

smallfin catshark
Fauna of the Southeastern United States
Fish of the Caribbean
Fish of the Dominican Republic
Taxa named by Stewart Springer
Taxa named by Phillip C. Heemstra
smallfin catshark